is a railway station in Yamaguchi, Yamaguchi Prefecture, Japan.

Lines
The station is served by the Yamaguchi Line.

Station layout
The station consists of a single side platform serving one track. The entrance to the station is located at the southwest end of the platform. An automatic ticket machine is also located there. The station is unattended.

Adjacent stations

History
The station opened on 10 April 1972.

External links
 Official website 

Railway stations in Yamaguchi Prefecture
Railway stations in Japan opened in 1972